Charlotte Woad (born 17 January 2004) is an English amateur golfer. She won the 2022 Girls Amateur Championship.

Golf career 
In 2021, Woad won the Welsh Women's Open Stroke Play Championship. In May 2022, she made her debut on the Ladies European Tour in the Madrid Open. In August 2022, Woad won the Girls Amateur Championship.

Personal life
Woad was born in January 2004, the daughter of Rachel and Nick Woad.

Amateur wins 

 2021 The Critchley Astor Salver, Welsh Women's Open Stroke Play Championship
 2022 Sir Henry Cooper Junior Masters, Girls Amateur Championship

Source:

Team appearances
Girls and Boys Home Internationals (representing England): 2021 (winners)
European Ladies' Team Championship (representing England): 2022 (winners)
Women's and Men's Home Internationals (representing England): 2022 (winners)
Espirito Santo Trophy (representing England): 2022

References 

English female golfers
Amateur golfers
Florida State Seminoles women's golfers
People from Farnham
2004 births
Living people